Jang Hyun-sung (born July 17, 1970) is a South Korean actor. He started his acting career as a member of the Hakjeon Theatre Company, before transitioning to film and television. Jang is best known for starring in director Song Il-gon's arthouse films such as Spider Forest (2004) and The Magicians (2006), and most notably Feathers in the Wind (2005), for which one review praised him for giving "the performance of his career." He also had major roles in Nabi (The Butterfly) (2001), Rewind (also known as A Man Watching Video, 2003), My Right to Ravage Myself (2005), Love Is a Crazy Thing (2005), and My Friend and His Wife (2008). Aside from acting, Jang was one of the screenwriters for the Moon Seung-wook film Romance (2006).

In 2013, Jang and his two sons began appearing in the reality/variety show The Return of Superman (also known as Superman is Back), in which celebrity fathers babysit their children by themselves for 48 hours after sending their wives on a 2-day vacation.

Filmography

Film

Television series

Variety shows

Radio shows

Hosting

Theater

Ambassadorship 
 Ambassador of the Seoul International Environmental Film Festival (2022)

Awards
 2019 KBS Drama Awards: Best Couple Award  (Doctor Prisoner)
 2016 Korea Drama Awards: Top Excellence Award, Actor (Doctors)
 2015 SBS Drama Awards: Special Award, Actor in a Drama (Heard It Through the Grapevine)
 2013 SBS Drama Awards: Special Award, Actor in a Weekend Drama (Goddess of Marriage)
 2007 KBS Drama Awards: Excellence Award, Actor in a Serial Drama (The Golden Era of Daughters-in-Law)
 2005 KBS Drama Awards: Best Actor in a One-Act/Special Drama (Leslie Cheung Is Dead?)

References

External links
 
 
 
 

1970 births
Living people
People from Geoje
South Korean male film actors
South Korean male television actors
South Korean screenwriters
YG Entertainment artists
Seoul Institute of the Arts alumni